The 1970 Buffalo Bills season was the franchise's 1st season in the National Football League, and the 11th overall. The team looked to improve on its 4–10 record from 1969 and make the playoffs for the first time since 1966. However, the Bills started out on the wrong foot, losing 4 of its first 5 games. After winning 2 straight road games against the Patriots and Jets and suffering a blowout loss to the Cincinnati Bengals, the Bills and Colts played to a 17–17 draw in week 9, Buffalo's first tie since 1968. The Bills would then lose 5 straight to end the season and finish the season 3-10-1, in fourth place in the AFC East. Their week 5 game against the Miami Dolphins would start a stage of futility in which the Bills would lose 20 straight games to the Dolphins. The Bills would not beat the Dolphins at any point during the 70s and would not beat Miami again until 1980. This would become known as "The Streak".

Offseason

NFL Draft

Personnel

Coaches/Staff 

 Source: https://pro-football-history.com/franchise/7/buffalo-bills-coaches

Final roster

Regular season

Schedule

Season summary

Week 1

Week 2

Week 3

Week 4

Week 5

Week 6

Week 7

Week 8

Week 9

Week 10

Week 11

Week 12

Week 13

Week 14

Standings

Awards and honors

References 

 Bills on Pro Football Reference
 Bills on jt-sw.com
 Bills Stats on jt-sw.com

Buffalo Bills seasons
Buffalo Bills
Buffalo Bills